The Civil Aviation Safety Authority (CASA) is the Australian national authority for the regulation of civil aviation. Although distinct from the government, it reports to the Federal Minister for Infrastructure and Transport.

CASA is responsible for monitoring civil air operations in Australia, issuing appropriate licences, enforcing safety requirements and protecting the environment from the effects of aircraft use.

History
Established on 6 July 1995 when the air safety functions of the former Civil Aviation Authority of Australia were separated from its other regulatory function of air traffic control (which went to Airservices Australia).

Role

CASA licences pilots, ground crew, aircraft and airfield operators. It is also responsible for enforcing safety requirements under the Commonwealth Civil Aviation Act 1988 and the Air Navigation Act 1920 and it must carry out its responsibilities in accordance with the Airspace Act 2007.  Although it is a corporate body distinct from the Australian Government, CASA is responsible to the Federal Minister for Infrastructure and Transport.

CASA was established on 6 July 1995 and its functions are defined by the Civil Aviation Act 1988.  Those functions include conducting the safety regulation of:
 civil air operations in Australian territory
 operation of Australian aircraft outside Australian territory
 developing and promulgating appropriate, clear and concise aviation safety standards
 developing effective enforcement strategies to secure compliance with aviation safety standards
 administering drug and alcohol management plans and testing
 issuing certificates, licenses, registrations and permits
 conducting comprehensive aviation industry surveillance
 conducting regular reviews of the system of civil aviation safety in order to monitor the safety performance of the aviation industry
 conducting regular assessment of international safety developments

CASA must regard the safety of air navigation as the most important consideration, however it must exercise its powers and perform its functions in a manner that ensures, as far as is practicable, the environment is protected from: (a) the effects of the operation and use of aircraft; and (b) the effects associated with the operation and use of aircraft. In practice there is uncertainty concerning which body assumes meaningful responsibility for the impact of aviation on the environment.

See also

 Australian PPL

References

External links
 
 
 Airservices Australia
 Department of Infrastructure and Regional Development

Australia
Commonwealth Government agencies of Australia
Civil aviation in Australia
Aviation organisations based in Australia
Regulatory authorities of Australia